Magnolia Cemetery is the name of at least 15 cemeteries in the United States:

Magnolia Cemetery (Mobile, Alabama), listed on the NRHP in Alabama, also known as Magnolia Cemetery including Mobile National Cemetery
Magnolia Cemetery (DeFuniak Springs, Florida)
Magnolia Cemetery (Augusta, Georgia)
Magnolia Cemetery (Baton Rouge, Louisiana), listed on the NRHP in Louisiana
Magnolia Cemetery (Philadelphia, Pennsylvania)
Magnolia Cemetery (Charleston, South Carolina), listed on the NRHP in South Carolina
Magnolia Cemetery (Greenwood, South Carolina), listed on the NRHP in South Carolina
Magnolia Cemetery (Hartsville, South Carolina), listed on the NRHP in South Carolina